The Ahbach Formation is a geologic formation in Germany. It preserves fossils dating back to the Middle Devonian period.

Fossil content 
The formation has provided among others the following fossils:

 Alveolites intermixtus
 Aulopora serpens
 Favosites saginatus
 Heliolites porosus
 Pachytheca stellimicans
 Platyaxum (Platyaxum) escharoides
 Platyaxum (Egosiella) clathratum
 Pseudopalaeoporella lummatonensis
 Thamnophyllum caespitosum
 Thamnopora nicholsoni
 Thamnopora cf. dubia
 Cupressocrinites sp.
 Girvanella sp.
 Resteignella sp.
 Sphaerocodium sp.
 ?Couvinianella sp.
 Trilobita indet.

See also 
 List of fossiliferous stratigraphic units in Germany

References

Further reading 
 S. M. L. Pohler, D. Brühl, and B. Mestermann. 1999. Struves Mud Mound am Weinberg - carbonate buildup-Fazies im otomari-Intervall, Hillesheimer Mulde, Eifel [Struve's mud mound from the Weinberg Quarry - carbonate buildup facies within the otomari interval, Hillesheim syncline, Eifel Hills]. Senckenbergiana lethaea 79(1):13-29
 U. Koch-Fruchtl and C. T. Gee. 1994. Middle Devonian Pseudopalaeoporella lummatonensis from the Rhenish Schiefergebirge (Sauerland and Eifel), Western Germany. Palaeontographica Abteilung B 232:1-13
 B.-P. Lütte. 1993. Zur stratigraphischen Verteilung tabulater Korallen im Mittel-Devon der Sätenicher Mulde (Rheinisches Schiefergebirge, Nord-Eifel). Geologica et Palaeontologica 27:55-71

Geologic formations of Germany
Devonian System of Europe
Devonian Germany
Devonian southern paleotemperate deposits
Devonian southern paleotropical deposits
Eifelian Stage
Givetian Stage
Limestone formations
Mudstone formations
Lagoonal deposits
Reef deposits
Shallow marine deposits